The Scottish Heavyweight Championship is the primary singles title in the Scottish Wrestling Alliance. It was first won by Conscience who defeated Eric Canyon, Adam Shane, and Hatred in Scotland on 17 July 2004. The title has generally been defended in Scotland, particularly in Bellshill, Bellahouston, Clydebank and Glasgow. It was originally created for British National Wrestling Alliance (NWA)-affiliated promotion NWA UK Hammerlock. The title was first defended outside of Scotland at the NWA 56th Anniversary Show in Winnipeg, Manitoba, Canada in 2004. Following the closure of NWA UK Hammerlock, the title was taken on by the Scottish Wrestling Alliance and the "NWA" was dropped from the name, resulting in the title simply being called the Scottish Heavyweight Championship. The title is currently vacant.

Title history

Reigns

See also
List of National Wrestling Alliance championships

References

External links
 Official NWA Scottish Heavyweight Championship History
 NWA Scottish Heavyweight Championship History

National Wrestling Alliance championships
NWA UK Hammerlock championships
Heavyweight wrestling championships
Regional professional wrestling championships
Professional wrestling in Scotland